Shemyak (Şemäk) is a rural locality (a selo) in Shemyaksky Selsoviet, Ufimsky District, Bashkortostan, Russia. The population was 428 as of 2010. There are 10 streets.

Geography 
Shemyak is located 40 km west of Ufa (the district's administrative centre) by road. Oktyabrsky is the nearest rural locality.

References 

Rural localities in Ufimsky District